Glastonbury 2000 is a live album by English musician David Bowie. It was recorded during his Sunday night headline slot at the Glastonbury Festival on 25 June 2000. The album marks the first time the full video and audio of the performance are released, 18 years after it took place. It was shown in its entirety for the first time on BBC2 on 28 June 2020.

Background
The crowd at Glastonbury that year was estimated at a quarter of a million people. Bowie asked pianist Mike Garson to "warm up the audience" before the show started on his own, like he had done before Ziggy Stardust's retirement show nearly 30 years earlier. 

Glastonbury co-organiser Emily Eavis commented, "I often get asked what the best set I've seen here at Glastonbury is, and Bowie's 2000 performance is always one which I think of first. It was spellbinding; he had an absolutely enormous crowd transfixed. I think Bowie had a very deep relationship with Worthy Farm and he told some wonderful stories about his first time at the Festival in 1971, when he stayed at the farmhouse and performed at 6am as the sun was rising. And he just played the perfect headline set. It really was a very special and emotional show." Garson said that of all the times he played with Bowie on stage, the Glastonbury show was his favorite.

Emily's father Michael, the founder of the festival, first met Bowie at Glastonbury in 1971. He said: "He's one of the three greatest of all-time: Frank Sinatra, Elvis Presley and David Bowie."

Track listing

Personnel
David Bowie – vocals, acoustic guitar, harmonica
Earl Slick – lead guitar
Mark Plati – rhythm guitar, acoustic guitar, bass guitar, backing vocals
Gail Ann Dorsey – bass guitar, rhythm guitar, clarinet, vocals
Sterling Campbell – drums, percussion
Mike Garson – keyboards, piano
Holly Palmer – percussion, vocals
Emm Gryner – keyboard, clarinet, vocals

Charts

References

2018 live albums
David Bowie live albums
Parlophone live albums
Albums produced by Tony Visconti
Glastonbury Festival
Live albums published posthumously
David Bowie video albums